Mario González Salas (born 6 June 1992) is a Spanish cyclist, who last rode for UCI Professional Continental team .

Career
He won the third and final stage of the 2018 Volta Internacional Cova da Beira. The stage was shortened due to weather conditions. He also won the mountain classification for the event.

Major results

2010
 1st  Time trial, National Junior Road Championships
 9th Time trial, UCI Juniors Road World Championships
2011
 1st  Time trial, National Under-23 Road Championships
2013
 National Under-23 Road Championships
1st  Road race
3rd Time trial
2015
 8th Korona Kocich Gór
 10th Overall Volta ao Alentejo
2017
 10th Clássica da Arrábida
2018
 Volta Internacional Cova da Beira
1st  Mountains classification
1st Stage 3
 2nd Overall GP Nacional 2 de Portugal
 Mediterranean Games
5th Road race
7th Time trial
 6th Overall Vuelta a Castilla y León
2019
 8th Overall Volta ao Alentejo
 9th Klasika Primavera

References

External links

1992 births
Living people
Spanish male cyclists
Cyclists from Cantabria
People from Torrelavega
Competitors at the 2018 Mediterranean Games
Mediterranean Games competitors for Spain
21st-century Spanish people